Rune Jansson (29 May 1932 – 24 November 2018) was a Swedish Greco-Roman wrestler. He competed at the 1956 and 1960 Olympics and won a bronze medal in 1956. He won another bronze at the 1958 World Championships, finishing fourth in 1955 and 1962.

References

External links
 

1932 births
2018 deaths
People from Skinnskatteberg Municipality
Olympic wrestlers of Sweden
Wrestlers at the 1956 Summer Olympics
Wrestlers at the 1960 Summer Olympics
Swedish male sport wrestlers
Olympic bronze medalists for Sweden
Olympic medalists in wrestling
World Wrestling Championships medalists
Medalists at the 1956 Summer Olympics
Sportspeople from Västmanland County